Gwanki is a village in the northwest of Kano State. Gwanki located in the Bagwai Local Government Area of Kano State.

References 

Populated places in Kano State